Henry Inman may refer to:
 Henry Inman (Royal Navy officer) (1762–1809), British Royal Navy officer
 Henry Inman (painter) (1801–1846), American portrait, genre, and landscape painter
 Henry Inman (police commander) (1816–1895), cavalry officer, founder and first commander of the South Australia Police
 Henry Inman (U.S. Army officer and author) (1837–1899), U.S. soldier and author
 Henry Inman (wrestler) (1886–1967), British Olympic wrestler